Euxoa campestris, the flat dart, is a moth of the family Noctuidae. The species was first described by Augustus Radcliffe Grote in 1875. It is found in North America from Newfoundland to Alaska, south to New England and southern Canada from southern Quebec west to British Columbia. In the west it is distributed southward in the Rocky Mountains to southern New Mexico, east-central Arizona, and central Utah. In the east it occurs in the Appalachians in eastern Kentucky and in western North Carolina.

The wingspan is 30–34 mm. Adults are on wing from July to September. There is one generation per year.

References

Pogue, Michael G. (2006). "The Noctuinae (Lepidoptera: Noctuidae) of Great Smoky Mountains National Park, U.S.A." Zootaxa. 1215: 1–95.

Euxoa
Moths of North America
Moths described in 1875